José Manuel Ramos Delgado (25 August 1935 – 3 December 2010) was an Argentine footballer and manager. He played for the Argentina national football team in two World Cups and had a successful tenure in Brazilian football with Santos. He went on to become a football manager, working in Argentina and Peru.

Early life
Ramos Delgado was born in the city of Quilmes, Argentina. He belonged to the Cape Verdean community in Argentina, as his father was a native of the islands, born in São Vicente.

Playing career

Club
Ramos Delgado started his playing career in 1956 with Lanús. He soon earned a move to River Plate where he played 172 games in seven seasons with the club.

In 1966, Ramos Delgado joined Banfield. After a short spell with the club, he moved to Brazil to play for Santos, where he played alongside Pelé, Coutinho and José Macia in the club's golden years. He continued playing for Santos until the age of 38, making a total of 324 appearances and scoring one goal.

In the last year of his playing career, Delgado played for Portuguesa Santista. He retired at the age of 39.

National team
Between 1958 and 1965, Ramos Delgado played 25 times for the Argentina national football team. He was included in the squads for the 1958 and 1962 FIFA World Cups, and played in the qualifiers for the 1966 World Cup.

Coaching career
After retiring as a player, Ramos Delgado had a spell as manager of Santos, before returning to Argentina where he worked as the manager of several football clubs including Belgrano, Deportivo Maipú, Gimnasia y Esgrima La Plata, Estudiantes de La Plata, River Plate, Talleres de Córdoba, Platense, All Boys and his home town club Quilmes. He also worked as the manager of Peruvian club Universitario.

He returned to Santos to work as a youth team coach helping to develop young players such as Robinho and Diego.

Death

Ramos Delgado died in a hospital in Villa Elisa on 3 December 2010, of Alzheimer's disease.

Honours

As a player
Santos
Campeonato Paulista (4): 1967, 1968, 1969, 1973
Torneio Roberto Gomes Pedrosa (1): 1968
Recopa Intercontinental (1): 1968

Argentina
Taça das Nações: 1964

References

External links

 

1935 births
2010 deaths
People from Quilmes
Afro-Argentine sportspeople
Argentine people of Cape Verdean descent
Sportspeople of Cape Verdean descent
Argentine footballers
Argentine expatriate footballers
Argentina international footballers
1958 FIFA World Cup players
1962 FIFA World Cup players
Association football defenders
Argentine Primera División players
Club Atlético Lanús footballers
Club Atlético River Plate footballers
Club Atlético Banfield footballers
Santos FC players
Santos FC managers
Associação Atlética Portuguesa (Santos) players
Expatriate footballers in Brazil
Argentine football managers
Club Atlético Belgrano managers
Club de Gimnasia y Esgrima La Plata managers
Estudiantes de La Plata managers
Club Atlético River Plate managers
Club Universitario de Deportes managers
Talleres de Córdoba managers
Club Atlético Platense managers
All Boys managers
Quilmes Atlético Club managers
Deaths from dementia in Argentina
Deaths from Alzheimer's disease
Sportspeople from Buenos Aires Province